Irene Cadurisch (born 23 October 1991) is a Swiss biathlete. She competed at the Biathlon World Championships 2012, with the Swiss relay team. She competed at the 2014 Winter Olympics in Sochi, in the individual race.

References

External links

1991 births
Living people
Biathletes at the 2014 Winter Olympics
Biathletes at the 2018 Winter Olympics
Biathletes at the 2022 Winter Olympics
Swiss female biathletes
Olympic biathletes of Switzerland
People from Maloja District
Sportspeople from Graubünden